Kernia is a genus of fungi in the family Microascaceae.

The genus name of Kernia is in honour of Frank Dunn Kern (1883–1973), who was an American plant pathologist and university administrator. He was a faculty member of Pennsylvania State University.

The genus was circumscribed by Julius Nieuwland in 1916.

Known species
According to GBIF;
 Kernia bifurcotricha 
 Kernia brachytricha 
 Kernia cauquensis 
 Kernia columnaris 
 Kernia furcotricha 
 Kernia geniculotricha 
 Kernia hippocrepida 
 Kernia irregularis 
 Kernia nitida 
 Kernia ovata 
 Kernia pachypleura 
 Kernia peruviana 
 Kernia retardata 
 Kernia setadisperma

References

External links
Index Fungorum

Microascales